Principles of the Theory of Probability is a 1939 book about probability by the philosopher Ernest Nagel. It is considered a classic discussion of its subject.

Reception
The philosopher Isaac Levi described Principles of the Theory of Probability as a well-known classic.

References

Bibliography
Books

 

1939 non-fiction books
American non-fiction books
Books by Ernest Nagel
Contemporary philosophical literature
English-language books
Philosophy books
Probability books
University of Chicago Press books